Porteous may refer to:

Surname
 Members of the Porteous family
 Beilby Porteus, Bishop of Chester and Bishop of London, noted abolitionist
 Bradley Porteous, South African cricketer
 Cameron Porteous, Canadian set designer
 Crichton Porteous, writer and author
 David Porteous, Canadian singer/songwriter and film maker
 Garrick Porteous, English golfer
 Gaye Porteous, Canadian field hockey international
 George Porteous, Lieutenant-Governor of Saskatchewan
 Gladstone Charles Porteous, Australian missionary and linguist in China
 Haydn Porteous, South African golfer
 Hugh Gordon Porteus, art and literature critic
 Ian Porteous, Scottish footballer
 Ian R. Porteous, Scottish mathematician
 James Porteous, inventor of the Fresno scraper
 John Porteous (soldier), Captain of the City Guard of Edinburgh lynched in the Porteous Riots
 John Alexander Porteous, columnist and journalist
 Johnny Porteous, Scottish footballer
 Julian Porteous, Bishop, Archdiocese of Sydney, Australia
 Katrina Porteous, Scottish poet
 Miguel Porteous, New Zealand skier
 Ned Porteous, British actor
 Nico Porteous, New Zealand skier
 Norman Porteous, theologian and translator of the New English Bible, last surviving officer of the First World War
 Patrick Anthony Porteous, Victoria Cross, war hero
 Rose Porteous, socialite
 Ryan Porteous, Scottish footballer
 Shane Porteous, Australian actor
 Stanley Porteus, psychologist and author
 Thomas Porteous, former United States district court judge
 Thomas Porteous (footballer), footballer for Sunderland and England
 Thomas Porteous (merchant), merchant and politician, Lower Canada
 Timothy Porteous, Order of Canada, former executive assistant to Pierre Trudeau
 Trevor Porteous, English football player and manager
 Victor Porteous, Canadian Member of Parliament
 William Porteous, Australian land developer

Others
 Porteous (store)
 The Porteous formula in algebraic geometry
 Porteous Point, on Signy Island, Antarctica
 The Porteous Riots of 1736
 Porteous's tuco-tuco, a rodent species

See also
 Joe Porteus, English footballer